Chondroitin sulfate ABC lyase may refer to:
 Chondroitin ABC lyase, an enzyme
 Chondroitin-sulfate-ABC exolyase, an enzyme
 Chondroitin-sulfate-ABC endolyase, an enzyme